Mulla Alaul Maulk Tuni was an Iranian architect. He was born in Ferdows (named "Toon" historically) in the 17th century.

He cooperated with Ali Mardan Khan in the construction of the Shalimar Gardens in Lahore in 1641 C.E.

He also designed and built the Fazelieh school in Mashhad from approximately 1650 to 1665.

Notes 

Iranian architects
People from Ferdows
Year of death unknown
Year of birth unknown